Guy Tinmouth Houlsby FREng is Professor of Civil Engineering and former Head of the Department of Engineering Science at the University of Oxford. He specialises in Geotechnical Engineering and more particularly in offshore foundations.

Education
He carried out research in Geotechnical Engineering at the University of Cambridge, under the advisory of Peter Wroth, leading to the award of a PhD degree in 1981 with his thesis titled "A Study of Plasticity Theories and Their Applicability to Soils".

Recognition
Professor Houlsby was invited to deliver the 54th BGA Rankine Lecture in 2014 at Imperial College, entitled "Interactions in Offshore Foundation Design". In 2001 he delivered the 5th BGA Géotechnique Lecture.

He was elected in 1999 as a Fellow of the Royal Academy of Engineering (FREng).

References

British civil engineers
Rankine Lecturers
Living people
Fellows of the Royal Academy of Engineering
Alumni of the University of Cambridge
Fellows of Brasenose College, Oxford
Year of birth missing (living people)